The IES Beatriz Galindo is a high school in Madrid, Spain. It is a bilingual school, utilizing both Spanish, English English and French.

References
http://www.beatrizgalindo.org/htmls/fotos1.htm
https://web.archive.org/web/20170917181437/http://www.beatrizgalindo.org/
http://www.google.es/imgres?q=ies+beatriz+galindo&hl=es&biw=1024&bih=585&gbv=2&t
http://revistaactivatic.blogspot.com.es/2010/02/nos-visita-el-colegio-beatriz-galindo.html

Secondary schools in the Community of Madrid
Schools in Madrid